The Prime Minister of India is the head of government of India. This is a list of things named after prime ministers of India.

Jawaharlal Nehru

Lal Bahadur Shastri 
 Airports
 Lal Bahadur Shastri International Airport

 Dams
 Lal Bahadur Shastri Dam

 Roads
 Lal Bahadur Shastri Marg

 Localities
 Shastri Nagar, Ahmedabad
 Shastri Nagar, Chennai
 Shastri Nagar, Delhi
 Shastri Nagar metro station
 Shastri Nagar, Goregaon
 Shastri Nagar, Great Nicobar
 Shastri Park
 Shastri Park metro station

 Stadiums
 Lal Bahadur Shastri Stadium, Hyderabad
 Lal Bahadur Shastri Stadium, Kollam

 Educational institutions
 L.B.S. College of Engineering
 Lal Bahadur Shastri College, Dharmabad
 Lal Bahadur Shastri College, Jaipur
 Lal Bahadur Shastri College of Advanced Maritime Studies and Research
 Lal Bahadur Shastri Integrated Institute of Science and Technology
 Lal Bahadur Shastri National Academy of Administration
 Lal Bahadur Shastri Memorial College
 Shri Lal Bahadur Shastri Government Medical College
 Shri Lal Bahadur Shastri National Sanskrit University

 Others
 Lal Bahadur Shastri National Award
 Shastri Bhawan
 Shastri Indo-Canadian Institute

Indira Gandhi

Morarji Desai
 Airports
 Morarji Desai Domestic Airport

 Educational institutions
 Morarji Desai National Institute of Yoga
 Morarji Desai Residential Schools for Minorities

 Others
 Morarji Desai Setu

Charan Singh
 Airports
 Chaudhary Charan Singh Airport
 Chaudhary Charan Singh International Airport metro station

 Educational institutions
 Chaudhary Charan Singh Post Graduate College
 Chaudhary Charan Singh College of Law
 Chaudhary Charan Singh Haryana Agricultural University
 Chaudhary Charan Singh Haryana Agricultural University Sports Complex
 Chaudhary Charan Singh University

Rajiv Gandhi

P. V. Narasimha Rao 
 Roads
 P. V. Narasimha Rao Expressway

 Educational institutions
 P. V. Narasimha Rao Telangana Veterinary University

Atal Bihari Vajpayee 
 Localities
 Atal Nagar
 Atal Park

 Stadiums
 Atal Bihari Vajpayee Stadium
 Bharat Ratna Shri Atal Bihari Vajpayee Ekana Cricket Stadium

 Educational Institutions
 Atal Bihari Vajpayee Government Institute of Engineering and Technology
 Atal Bihari Vajpayee Government Medical College
 Atal Bihari Vajpayee Hindi Vishwavidyalaya
 Atal Bihari Vajpayee Indian Institute of Information Technology and Management
 Atal Bihari Vajpayee Institute of Medical Sciences
 Atal Bihari Vajpayee Institute of Mountaineering and Allied Sports
 Atal Bihari Vajpayee Medical University
 Atal Bihari Vajpayee Vishwavidyalaya
 Atal Medical and Research University

 Parks
 Atal Bihari Vajpayee Regional Park

 Others
 Atal Bhujal Yojana
 Atal I
 Atal II
 Atal Indore City Transport Service Limited
 Atal Mission for Rejuvenation and Urban Transformation
 Atal Pension Yojana
 Atal Setu, Goa
 Atal Setu, Jammu and Kashmir
 Atal Tunnel
 Vajpayee Arogyasri Yojana

Inder Kumar Gujral 
 Educational institutions

 I. K. Gujral Punjab Technical University

Manmohan Singh 
 Educational institutions

 Dr Manmohan Singh Scholarship

Narendra Modi 
 Educational institutions

 Narendra Modi Medical College

 Stadiums

 Narendra Modi Stadium

See also 
 List of things named after presidents of India
 List of things named after prime ministers of the United Kingdom
 List of things named after Saudi kings
 List of things named after Mahatma Gandhi
 List of things named after B. R. Ambedkar
 List of eponymous roads in Delhi
 List of eponymous roads in Mumbai

References 

Lists relating to prime ministers of India
India